The Via Salaria was an ancient Roman road in Italy.

It eventually ran from Rome (from Porta Salaria of the Aurelian Walls) to Castrum Truentinum (Porto d'Ascoli) on the Adriatic coast, a distance of 242 km. The road also passed through Reate (Rieti) and Asculum (Ascoli Piceno).

Strada statale 4 Via Salaria (SS4) is the modern state highway that maintains the old road's name and runs on the same path from Rome to the Adriatic sea.

History
The Via Salaria owes its name to the Latin word for "salt", since it was the route by which the Sabines living nearer the Tyrrhenian sea  came to fetch salt from the marshes at the mouth of the river Tiber, the Campus Salinarum (near Portus). Peoples nearer the Adriatic Sea used it to fetch it from production sites there. It was one of many ancient salt roads in Europe, and some historians consider the Salaria and the trade in salt to have been the origin of the settlement of Rome. Some remains still exist of the mountain sections of the road.

Roman bridges 

There are the remains of several Roman bridges along the road, including the Ponte del Gran Caso, Ponte della Scutella, Ponte d’Arli, Ponte di Quintodecimo, Ponte Romano (Acquasanta), Ponte Salario and Ponte Sambuco.

See also 
Roman bridge
Roman engineering
Catacomb of Priscilla

References

External links
Via Salaria (Platner and Ashby's A Topographical Dictionary of Ancient Rome, London: Oxford University Press, 1929)

Salaria, Via
Transport in Lazio
Transport in le Marche
Transport in Abruzzo
Rome Q. II Parioli
Rome Q. III Pinciano
Rome Q. IV Salario
Rome Q. XVII Trieste